Thomas M. (Tom) Whitney (January 7, 1939 - November 1986) is best known as an inventor of the pocket calculator and an early employee of Apple Computer.

He joined Hewlett-Packard in 1967, where he helped develop the HP-35, the world's first handheld scientific electronic calculator. During the HP years, he was also a lecturer at Santa Clara University.

He later joined Apple as employee 15 and in 1978 became executive vice president of engineering, working directly with Steve Jobs and Jef Raskin on the Macintosh project.

Whitney completed BS (1961), MS (1962) and PhD (1964) degrees in electrical engineering at Iowa State University, where he was a member of Acacia fraternity. He graduated from Aurelia High School in Aurelia, Iowa in 1957.

Whitney died in 1986 at age 47.

References

External links
 Stories about the Macintosh

American computer businesspeople
1986 deaths
1939 births